Huanggu District is one of ten districts of the prefecture-level city of Shenyang, the capital of the Chinese province of Liaoning. It borders Shenbei New Area to the north, Dadong to the east, Shenhe to the southeast, Heping to the south, Tiexi to the southwest, and Yuhong to the west.

Toponymy 
The district is named after Huanggutun ("tun" means village), where the Huanggutun Incident of 1928 took place.

Politics 
Huanggu District hosts the seat of the Provincial Government of Liaoning.

Administrative divisions

Huanggu has twelve subdistricts:

Liaohe Subdistrict
Shouquan Subdistrict
Santaizi Subdistrict
Minglian Subdistrict
Tawan Subdistrict
Huanghe Subdistrict
Lingbei Subdistrict
Huashan Subdistrict
Xinle Subdistrict
Sandongqiao Subdistrict
Shelita Subdistrict
Beita Subdistrict
Lingdong Subdistrict

Education

The main campus of the Liaoning University of Traditional Chinese Medicine (LNUTCM) is in this district.

Visitor attractions 
The district is the site of Beiling park, the large historical mausoleum of Qing dynasty emperor Huang Taiji, as well as the Liaoning Mansion Hotel.

References

External links

County-level divisions of Liaoning
Shenyang